Harbert Management Corporation, based in Birmingham, Alabama, is a U.S. investment management company founded in 1993 by Raymond J. Harbert.

Overview
The company has investment funds in nine alternative asset classes in three areas of concentration: real assets, private capital, and absolute return strategies. The company was previously the majority owner of Harbinger Capital. HMC provided the original funding for Harbinger and its funds. The company also owns Harbert Realty Services.

HMC has offices in Birmingham, Atlanta, Dallas, Nashville, New York, Richmond, San Francisco, Los Angeles, London, Luxembourg, Paris, and Madrid.

In 1998, the company established the HERO Foundation, which provides direct financial assistance to help people who have been affected by natural disasters, medical conditions or temporary financial hardships to regain their independence and self-sufficiency.

See also
Harbert Corporation, an international construction, energy, and investment company founded by John M. Harbert and Bill L. Harbert and the predecessor company to Harbert Management Corporation
B.L. Harbert International, founded by Bill L. Harbert from Harbert Corporation's former international construction division
Harbinger Capital, hedge fund formerly owned by HMC

References

External links
Harbert Management Corporation Website
Harbert Realty Services Website

Companies based in Birmingham, Alabama
Investment management companies of the United States
Financial services companies of the United States
Financial services companies established in 1993
Private equity firms of the United States
Harbert family